Quail Valley may refer to:

Quail Valley, Menifee, California, a community in Menifee, California
Quail Valley (Missouri City, Texas), a neighborhood in Missouri City, Texas